Glendale is a city in Maricopa County, Arizona, United States, located approximately  northwest of Downtown Phoenix. As of the 2020 census, it has a population of 248,325.

History
In the late 1800s the area that is now Glendale was all desert. William John Murphy, a native of New Hartford, New York, who resided in the town of Flagstaff in what was then the territory of Arizona, was in charge of building the  Arizona Canal from Granite Reef to New River for the Arizona Canal Company. In 1885, he completed the canal, which would bring water to the desert land. Murphy was deep in debt, since he had agreed to be paid in Arizona Canal Company stock and bonds and land instead of cash.

In 1887, Murphy formed the Arizona Improvement Company. His objective was to sell the land and water rights south of the canal. Murphy raised capital from out of state sources in order to meet payroll and construction expenses. Murphy decided to refer to this land as "Glendale". In order to develop and interest potential investors and settlers in this new town, Murphy decided to provide a better way of access from Phoenix to Glendale and ending in the town of Peoria by building an  diagonal road which he named Grand Avenue.

In 1891, Burgess Hadsell worked with Murphy to bring 70 Brethren and River Brethren families to Glendale to form a temperance colony. Soon settlers, attracted by the town's ban on alcoholic beverages, continued to arrive. In 1895, Murphy platted the original town site and amended the plat to include a town park and some business lots.  It was bounded by Lamar Road on the south, 55th Avenue on the east, Myrtle Avenue on the north, and 59th Avenue on the west. The construction of a railroad from Prescott to Phoenix was made possible with an exchange of the right-of-way made by Murphy along Grand Avenue. The railroad allowed Glendale settlers to transport goods to the north and easily receive building materials.

The construction and commercial applications of the Beet Sugar Factory in 1906 also contributed to the growth of Glendale. Though the operations of the factory only lasted until 1913, it played an important role in the increase of immigrant and migrant settlers in the city.

Geography
The New River and Agua Fria River flow southward through the western extremities of the city.

Climate

Demographics

As of the census of 2010, there are 226,710 people, 79,114 households, and 54,721 families residing in the city. The racial makeup of the city was 75.54% White, 6% Black or African American, 1.7% Native American, 3.9% Asian, 0.2% Pacific Islander, 16.95% from other races, and 4.0% from two or more races. 35.5% of the population were Hispanic or Latino of any race.

There were 79,114 households, out of which 39.9% had children under the age of 18 living with them, 53.5% were married couples living together, 12.8% had a female householder with no husband present, and 28.2% were non-families. 21.3% of all households were made up of individuals, and 5.8% had someone living alone who was 65 years of age or older. The average household size was 2.85 and the average family size was 3.33.

In the city, the population was spread out, with 30.1% under the age of 18, 10.8% from 18 to 24, 31.9% from 25 to 44, 19.9% from 45 to 64, and 7.4% who were 65 years of age or older. The median age was 31 years. For every 100 females, there were 99.6 males. For every 100 females age 18 and over, there were 97.1 males.

The median income for a household in the city was $45,015, and the median income for a family was $51,162. Males had a median income of $35,901 versus $27,736 for females. The per capita income for the city was $19,124. About 8.8% of families and 11.9% of the population were below the poverty line, including 15.3% of those under age 18 and 9.5% of those age 65 or over.

Economy

Top employers

Source: AZCentral.com

Arts and culture

Attractions

 Adobe Mountain Desert Park
 Glendale Chocolate Festival (every February) 
 Glendale Folk & Heritage Festival
 Glendale Glitters (every December)
 Glendale Jazz and Blues Festival
 Manistee Ranch
 Sahuaro Ranch
 Cerreta Candy Co. factory tour
 State Farm Stadium
 Gila River Arena
 Camelback Ranch
 Elsie McCarthy Sensory Garden
 Westgate Entertainment District

Shopping
Glendale is noted for its retail sales of antiques.

The Arrowhead Towne Center mall is located here.

Historic sites

Concerts 
Glendale was temporarily renamed as Swift City on March 17 and 18, 2023, as per the mayor and the city council's proclamation, to celebrate the opening concerts of the Eras Tour, the sixth concert tour by American singer-songwriter Taylor Swift, at State Farm Stadium. The Westgate Entertainment District, a mixed-use complex in the city, additionally put up welcoming messages, with the local restaurants offering Swift-themed menu items. State Farm also hosted the Super Bowl LVII halftime show, headlined by Barbadian singer Rihanna, shortly before the tour.

Sports

Glendale is the site of two major sports venues:  State Farm Stadium and Gila River Arena. Both venues are part of the Glendale Sports and Entertainment District development plan, meant to spur growth in the sparsely inhabited Yucca district. Both venues are owned by the City of Glendale.

State Farm Stadium has been the home field of the Arizona Cardinals in the National Football League since 2006, and the annual Fiesta Bowl college football game since 2007. Both the Cardinals and bowl game moved from Sun Devil Stadium on the Arizona State University campus in Tempe. Since opening, the facility has brought three Super Bowls, three college football national championship games, the NCAA Men's Basketball Final Four, WrestleMania XXVI and International Champions Cup soccer to Glendale. Designed by architect Peter Eisenman, the stadium was featured on The History Channel TV series, Modern Marvels because of its roll-out natural grass field.

Gila River Arena (formerly Glendale Arena, then Jobing.com Arena) and Westgate City Center is adjacent to State Farm Stadium, and was the home of the Arizona Coyotes of the National Hockey League (NHL). It was also the home of the now defunct Arizona Sting of the National Lacrosse League (NLL). The inaugural Street League Skateboarding event was held in the summer of 2010 in Glendale at the Gila River Arena. This street skateboarding competition returns to Glendale annually.

In 2009, the Los Angeles Dodgers and the Chicago White Sox  of Major League Baseball began to share the new  Camelback Ranch-Glendale spring training complex and stadium in Glendale owned and operated by the City of Glendale.

Education
There are a number of higher education campuses in Glendale. Glendale Community College and Glendale Community College North, just across the border in northwestern Phoenix, are members of the Maricopa County Community College District. Arizona State University’s Thunderbird School of Global Management was founded in Glendale at Thunderbird Field after World War II and recently relocated its campus to the downtown location of ASU after joining the university as an independent unit dedicated to international business education. West campus is just across the border from Glendale in west Phoenix.  Midwestern University is a graduate college of medicine located in Glendale.

Many school districts serve the city of Glendale.

The following school districts serve the city:
 Unified school districts
 Deer Valley Unified School District
 Dysart Unified School District
 Peoria Unified School District (headquartered in Glendale)
 High school districts
 Glendale Union High School District
 Phoenix Union High School District
 Tolleson Union High School District
 Elementary school districts
 Alhambra Elementary School District
 Glendale Elementary School District
 Pendergast Elementary School District
 Washington Elementary School District

Grace Lutheran School is a Pre-K-8 Christian school of the Wisconsin Evangelical Lutheran Synod (WELS) in Glendale.

New Gains Academy is a grade 5-12 Microschool in Glendale. with academics, business entrepreneurship, piano, voice, dance and art programs.

Our Lady of Perpetual Help Catholic School is a Pre-K-8 Catholic school of the Roman Catholic Diocese of Phoenix in Glendale.

Infrastructure

Transportation
The city of Glendale has a roughly average percentage of households without a car. In 2015, 8.4 percent of Glendale households lacked a car, and increased slightly to 9 percent in 2016. The national average was 8.7 percent in 2016. Glendale averaged 1.72 cars per household in 2016, compared to a national average of 1.8.

Glendale Municipal Airport serves the city but it does not offer commercial air services. The closest commercial airport is Phoenix Sky Harbor International Airport, located about 30 minutes away by car.

Highways
  Loop 101 (Agua Fria Freeway)
  Loop 303 (Estrella Freeway)
 Northern Parkway (Northern Freeway)
  US-60 (Grand Avenue)

Notable people

 Prince Amukamara, professional football player
 Eddie Bonine, professional baseball player
 Elijah Burke, professional wrestler
 Danny Cruz, professional soccer player
 Nick Evans, professional baseball player
 Trent Franks, former United States congressman
 Lauren Froderman, winner of So You Think You Can Dance (Season 7)
 Jennie Garth, actress
 Paul LoDuca, professional baseball player
 Craig Mabbitt, lead vocalist of band Escape the Fate
 Michael McDowell, NASCAR driver
 Evan Mecham, former Arizona governor
 Lou Novikoff, professional baseball player
 Sterling Ridge, Arizona legislator
 Marty Robbins, Grammy-winning country musician and auto racer
 Nate Ruess, lead singer of Fun
 Tage Thompson, NHL player for the Buffalo Sabres
 Rickson van Hees, American soccer player
 Jason Zumwalt, actor

Sister cities
Glendale has two sister cities:
  – Ørland, Norway
  – Memmingen, Germany

See also

 USS Arizona salvaged artifacts
 List of people from Phoenix
 Glendale Memorial Park Cemetery

Notes

References

External links

 

 
Cities in Arizona
Cities in Maricopa County, Arizona
Phoenix metropolitan area
Populated places in the Sonoran Desert
Populated places established in the 19th century